Captain Ardant (French: Capitaine Ardant) is a 1951 French spy film directed by André Zwoboda and starring Yves Vincent, Renée Saint-Cyr and Jean Danet. It is an adaptation of the 1938 novel Captain Ardant by Pierre Nord. There had been several previous attempts to film the novel, but none had been completed.

Cast
 Yves Vincent as Le capitaine Pierre Ardant  
 Renée Saint-Cyr as Maria del Fuego  
 Jean Danet as Idjilla  
 Roland Toutain as Lionel Mancelle  
 Raymond Cordy as Jules  
 Guy Decomble as Jossip  
 Robert Hébert as Barberousse  
 Robert Lussac as Le caïd Si Kébir  
 Gilles Quéant as Duval  
 Thomy Bourdelle as Le colonel  
 Georges Lautner as Un militaire  
 Caroline Lautner as Leila  
 André Zwoboda as L'homme qui conduit la carriole  
 Serge Bourguignon as Un militaire 
 Louis Lalanne

References

Bibliography 
 Rège, Philippe. Encyclopedia of French Film Directors, Volume 1. Scarecrow Press, 2009.

External links 
 

1951 films
1950s spy films
French spy films
1950s French-language films
Films directed by André Zwoboda
French Foreign Legion in popular culture
French black-and-white films
Films about the French Foreign Legion
1950s French films